Stéphane Bouthiaux (born 26 March 1966) is a French biathlete. He competed in the men's sprint event at the 1994 Winter Olympics.

References

1966 births
Living people
French male biathletes
Olympic biathletes of France
Biathletes at the 1994 Winter Olympics
People from Pontarlier
Sportspeople from Doubs